Igor Saršon (born 24 March 1980 in Rijeka) is a Croatian handballer, who plays was goalkeeper and now a youth coach in Opatija.

Honours
RK Zamet
Croatian First League 
Third (2): 1997-98, 1998-99
1.B HRL (1): 
Winner1995-96
Croatian U-19 Championship (1):
Winner 1996
Croatian Cup 
Runner-up (3): 2000, 2001, 2012

References

External links
 European Competition stats
 Premier League stats

1980 births
Living people
Croatian male handball players
Handball players from Rijeka
RK Zamet players
RK Crikvenica players